Chester Historic District in Chester, South Carolina is a historic district that was listed on the National Register of Historic Places in 1972.

The district contains 324 contributing properties.

References

Historic districts on the National Register of Historic Places in South Carolina
Gothic Revival architecture in South Carolina
Geography of Chester County, South Carolina
Buildings and structures in Chester County, South Carolina
National Register of Historic Places in Chester County, South Carolina